

130001–130100 

|-id=006
| 130006 Imranaslam ||  || Imran Aslam (born 1977), electronics lead for the OSIRIS-REx asteroid sample-return mission's laser altimeter at MDA. Prior to this, he was the Lead for the Mars Curiosity Rover's Alpha Particle X-ray Spectrometer, and Electronics Lead for the Metrology sensors on the Phoenix Mars Lander || 
|-id=007
| 130007 Frankteti ||  || Frank Teti (born 1966), program manager for the development of the OSIRIS-REx asteroid sample-return mission's laser altimeter. Prior to this, he was the Manager of Autonomous Robotics at MDA and focused on commercial and civilian missions for lunar exploration/exploitation and orbital debris removal || 
|-id=066
| 130066 Timhaltigin ||  || Timothy Haltigin (born 1976), the Senior Mission Scientist in Planetary Exploration at the Canadian Space Agency. He is actively involved in the preparatory stages for a variety of planetary sample return missions, and is the Mission Manager for the OSIRIS-REx asteroid sample-return mission's laser altimeter. || 
|-id=067
| 130067 Marius-Phaneuf ||  || Rene-Pier Marius-Phaneuf (born 1971), a Senior Project Manager at the Canadian Space Agency. He is responsible for the delivery of the OLA instrument to the OSIRIS-REx asteroid sample-return mission. He has been involved in the Canadian contributions to Herschel (HIFI), the Mars Science Laboratory (APXS) and JWST (FGS-NIRISS) || 
|-id=069
| 130069 Danielgaudreau ||  || Daniel Gaudreau (born 1969), the lead systems engineer for the OSIRIS-REx asteroid sample-return mission's laser altimeter. || 
|-id=071
| 130071 Claudebrunet ||  || Claude Brunet (born 1956), flight software manager at the Canadian Space Agency. He oversaw the development of the OSIRIS-REx asteroid sample-return mission's laser altimeter, of the Alpha Particle X-ray Spectrometer currently on MSL (member of the MSL Operation team), and of the Phoenix Meteorological Station instrument || 
|-id=072
| 130072 Ilincaignat ||  || Luminita Ilinca Ignat (born 1968), a deputy project manager at the Canadian Space Agency for the OSIRIS-REx asteroid sample-return mission's laser altimeter. Prior to serving in this role, she was the CSA Deputy Project Manager for the James Webb Space Telescope Fine Guidance Sensor/Near InfraRed Imager and Slitless Spectrograph || 
|-id=078
| 130078 Taschner ||  || Rudolf Taschner, professor of mathematics at the Technical University of Vienna || 
|-id=088
| 130088 Grantcunningham ||  || Grant Cunningham (born 1959) specialized in lidar from Graduate School at York University through 25 years of involvement at Optech Incorporated where he is a Senior Scientist with a speciality in sensor calibration. He is the Optech technical lead for the OSIRIS-REx asteroid sample-return mission's laser altimeter. || 
|-id=089
| 130089 Saadatanwar ||  || Saadat Anwar (born 1972), the GSE & Software Lead for the OTES instrument on the OSIRIS-REx asteroid sample-return mission. He leads a team of Software Engineers at the Mars Space Flight Facility, and has developed targeting & analysis software for the LRO, MRO, Mars Odyssey, MER and MGS missions || 
|-id=090
| 130090 Heatherbowles ||  || Heather Bowles (born 1989), the configuration manager for the Thermal Emission Spectrometer Instrument on the OSIRIS-REx asteroid sample-return mission || 
|}

130101–130200 

|-id=126
| 130126 Stillmanchase ||  || Stillman Chase (born 1932), systems engineer for the OTES instrument on OSIRIS-REx asteroid sample-return mission. He was an instrument Co-Investigator on Mariners 2, 6, 7, 9 and 10, Vikings 1 & 2, Pioneers 10 & 11 and Mars Global Surveyor. Chase was an instrument Principal Investigator on Mariner 10 || 
|-id=127
| 130127 Zoltanfarkas ||  || Zoltan Farkas (born 1975), mechanical engineer for the OTES instrument on the OSIRIS-REx asteroid sample-return mission. He has designed and fabricated components to enhance electron-microscopes, flight hardware for Mini-TES, THEMIS instruments, and ultra-high pressure instrumentations for ALVIN submersible || 
|-id=128
| 130128 Tarafisher ||  || Tara Fisher (born 1968), program administrator for the Thermal Emission Spectrometer Instrument on the OSIRIS-REx asteroid sample-return mission || 
|-id=158
| 130158 Orsonjohn ||  || Orson John (born 1987), member of the Safety and Mission Assurance team of the OSIRIS-REx asteroid sample-return mission serving as the reliability engineer for OTES as well as serving in a similar role on MAVEN and ATLAS. He is now serving as a quality engineer for the ATLAS/ ICESat-2 mission during Integration and Testing || 
|-id=161
| 130161 Iankubik ||  || Ian Kubik (born 1988), mechanical engineer for the OTES instrument on the OSIRIS-REx asteroid sample-return mission. This is his first major engineering role since graduating from Arizona State University || 
|}

130201–130300 

|-id=229
| 130229 Igorlazbin ||  || Igor Lazbin (born 1965), the Controls Lead for the OTES instrument on the OSIRIS-REx asteroid sample-return mission. He was the Guidance Navigation and Controls Lead on several NASA and Air Force spacecraft projects and developed controls solutions for a variety of spacecraft applications || 
|-id=249
| 130249 Markminer ||  || Mark Miner (born 1985), thermal engineer on the Thermal Emission Spectrometer Instrument on the OSIRIS-REx asteroid sample-return mission || 
|-id=283
| 130283 Elizabethgraham ||  || Elizabeth Brady and Graham Lawrence Brady, the parents of New Zealand discoverer Nigel Brady. They were instrumental in recognizing and encouraging the discoverer's early interest in science and particularly astronomy, for which the discoverer is eternally grateful. || 
|}

130301–130400 

|-id=314
| 130314 Williamodonnell ||  || William O'Donnel (born 1952), mechanical engineer on the Thermal Emission Spectrometer Instrument on the OSIRIS-REx asteroid sample-return mission || 
|-id=319
| 130319 Danielpelham ||  || Daniel Pelham (born 1960), lead opto-mechanical engineer for the OTES instrument on the OSIRIS-REx asteroid sample-return mission. He was a senior member of the technical staff at Santa Barbara Remote Sensing where he helped develop a wide range of earth and planetary instruments || 
|-id=320
| 130320 Maherrassas ||  || Maher Rassas (born 1951), mission assurance engineer on the Thermal Emission Spectrometer Instrument on the OSIRIS-REx asteroid sample-return mission || 
|}

130401–130500 

|-bgcolor=#f2f2f2
| colspan=4 align=center | 
|}

130501–130600 

|-bgcolor=#f2f2f2
| colspan=4 align=center | 
|}

130601–130700 

|-bgcolor=#f2f2f2
| colspan=4 align=center | 
|}

130701–130800 

|-bgcolor=#f2f2f2
| colspan=4 align=center | 
|}

130801–130900 

|-bgcolor=#f2f2f2
| colspan=4 align=center | 
|}

130901–131000 

|-bgcolor=#f2f2f2
| colspan=4 align=center | 
|}

References 

130001-131000